The Pittsburg–Chartierville Border Crossing connects the towns of Chartierville, Quebec, and Pittsburg, New Hampshire. The crossing can be reached by U.S. Route 3 on the American side and by Quebec Route 257 on the Canadian side.

Description
It is the only crossing on the Canada–United States border in the state of New Hampshire which is the only state in the United States with a single international border crossing, and serves about 10,000 vehicles a year. Pittsburg is notable for being the largest township (in terms of land area) in the continental United States.  Although there was a U.S. border station at Connecticut Lakes as far back as the 1930s, the facility consisted of a small one-room structure, and later a mobile home.  The U.S. did not have a permanent inspection facility at the border until 1960, and the northernmost stretch of U.S. Route 3 remained unpaved until about 1970.  In 2012, the U.S. built a new border inspection facility.  The Fourth Connecticut Lake Trail starts near the parking lot of the border station.

Incident related to millennium attack plots

In the late 1990s, some low-traffic border crossings between the U.S. and Canada were equipped with a Remote Video Inspection System (RVIS), which could be used to admit low-risk travelers to the U.S. during times that a station did not have staff on-site. As the Pittsburg border station was only staffed during limited hours, it received an RVIS, which entered operation on January 4, 1999. Using RVIS, the station was being operated remotely from 4 p.m. to 8 a.m. in December 1999.

At 2:35 a.m. on December 15, 1999, an Italian-born Canadian woman named Lucia Garofalo tried to use the RVIS to enter the U.S., traveling with a man lacking identification who claimed to be a Pakistani-born Canadian citizen, and a trunk full of packages that were later suspected to be explosives. The remote inspector denied them entry and instructed them to report to a staffed border crossing; they instead retreated into Canada. Garofalo had, on December 6, successfully entered the U.S. at the same crossing with two passengers, then re-entered Canada on December 12 via the Derby Line–Stanstead Border Crossing with her son and a man claiming to be an Algerian national who lacked identification; Canadian authorities allowed them to enter Canada and reported the incident to U.S. officials.

On December 19, Garofalo tried to enter the U.S. at the Beecher Falls–East Hereford Border Crossing with a man who claimed to be Algerian—when an initial inspection detected her recent failed entry, a search was conducted, which found that the man had a forged French passport; both were arrested. Garofalo was later found to have ties to Ahmed Ressam, an Algerian member of al-Qaeda who was arrested by Customs Service officials in Port Angeles, Washington, on December 14, 1999, when he tried to enter the U.S. with explosives hidden in the trunk of his car. It was later established that Ressam planned to bomb Los Angeles International Airport (LAX) on New Year's Eve 1999.

At Beecher Falls, Garofalo's vehicle contained no explosives, but trace elements were detected, suggesting that it previously had contained explosive material. What role, if any, Garofalo may have had with the millennium attack plots remains unclear. Garofalo was prosecuted on alien smuggling charges, largely on the strength of the audio recording of her declarations via the RVIS. Statements she made that evening, which included that her traveling companion was her brother, were proven to be untrue. At that time, the Pittsburg border station was the only one of the 163 U.S. land border stations where both audio and video of primary inspections were recorded. Garofalo pleaded guilty in February 2000 and was allowed to return to Canada; she received a sentence of two years' probation in May 2000. Ultimately, it was determine that the man arrested with Garofalo was actually Moroccan—he remained in jail until May 2000, when he was sentenced to two year's supervised release and was returned to Canada. While there was no failure of the RVIS, this incident prompted the Immigration and Naturalization Service to cease using it. The program as a whole was suspended following the September 11 attacks, and was decommissioned in November 2002.

See also
 List of Canada–United States border crossings

References

Canada–United States border crossings
Geography of Estrie
U.S. Route 3
1949 establishments in New Hampshire
1949 establishments in Quebec
Buildings and structures in Coös County, New Hampshire